Ealing Council is elected every four years.

Political control
The first election to the council was held in 1964, initially operating as a shadow authority before the new system came into full effect in 1965. Political control of the council since 1964 has been held by the following parties:

Leadership
The leaders of the council since 1965 have been:

Council elections
 1964 Ealing London Borough Council election
 1968 Ealing London Borough Council election
 1971 Ealing London Borough Council election
 1974 Ealing London Borough Council election
 1978 Ealing London Borough Council election (boundary changes increased the number of seats by ten)
 1982 Ealing London Borough Council election
 1986 Ealing London Borough Council election
 1990 Ealing London Borough Council election
 1994 Ealing London Borough Council election (boundary changes increased the number of seats by one)
 1998 Ealing London Borough Council election
 2002 Ealing London Borough Council election (boundary changes reduced the number of seats by two) 
 2006 Ealing London Borough Council election
 2010 Ealing London Borough Council election
 2014 Ealing London Borough Council election
 2018 Ealing London Borough Council election
 2022 Ealing London Borough Council election (boundary changes increased the number of seats by one)

Borough result maps

By-election results

1964-1968
There were no by-elections.

1968-1971

1971-1974

1974-1978

1978-1982

1982-1986

1986-1990

1990-1994

The by-election was called following the death of Cllr. Robert Hetherington.

The by-election was called following the resignation of Cllr. Honor J. Graham.

The by-election was called following the death of Cllr. Henry H. Allen.

The by-election was called following the resignation of Cllr. Anthony C. John.

1994-1998

The by-election was called following the death of Cllr. John I. Wood.

The by-election was called following the death of Cllr. Chanan S. Lachhar and the resignation of Cllr. Tara S. Dyal.

 
The by-election was called following the resignation of Cllr. Jasbinder K. Birt.

The by-election was called following the resignation of Cllr. Roderick G. Baptie.

1998-2002

The by-election was called following the resignation of Cllr. Brian R. Reeves.

The by-election was called following the resignation of Cllr. Hilary J. Benn.

The by-election was called following the resignation of Cllr. Judith E. Field.

2002-2006

The by-election was called following the resignation of Cllr. Sophie E. Hosking.

The by-election was called following the death of Cllr. Peter Downham.

2006-2010

The by-election was called following the death of Cllr. Brian H. Castle.

The by-election was called following the resignation of Cllr. Sonika Nirwal.

2010-2014
There were no by-elections.

2014-2018

The by-election was called following the resignation of Councillor Mark Reen.

External links
 Ealing Council